Manfred Broy (born 10 August 1949, Landsberg am Lech) is a German computer scientist, and an emeritus professor in the Department of Informatics at the Technical University of Munich, Garching, Germany.

Biography
Broy gained his Doctor of Philosophy (Ph.D.) in 1980 at the chair of Friedrich L. Bauer on the subject of transformation of programs running in parallel (Transformation parallel ablaufender Programme).

In 1983, he founded the faculty of mathematics and computer science at the University of Passau, which dean he was until 1986. In 1989, he went to the Technical University of Munich (TUM), where in 1992, he became the founding dean of the informatics faculty, which until then was an institute within the faculty of mathematics and informatics. Since then he has been teaching at the Technical University of Munich.

In 2004, he was elected as a fellow of the Gesellschaft für Informatik and in 2007, he won the Konrad Zuse Medal. He is also editor of the International Journal of Software and Informatics. Broy has been a director of the International Summer School Marktoberdorf.

He retired on 31 March 2015.

Selected books

References

External links
 
 

1949 births
Living people
People from Landsberg am Lech
Technical University of Munich alumni
Academic staff of the Technical University of Munich
German computer scientists
Formal methods people
Gottfried Wilhelm Leibniz Prize winners
Academic staff of the University of Passau